Ananya Nagalla (born Anusha Nagalla) is an Indian actress who appears in Telugu films. She made her debut in the 2019 film Mallesham and went onto appear in films such as Play Back (2021) and Vakeel Saab (2021). She was nominated for SIIMA Award for Best Female Debut – Telugu.

Early life 
Nagalla was born in a Telugu family in Sathupalli of Khammam district in Telangana (then in Andhra Pradesh) to Venkateswara Rao and Vishnu Priya. Her father is a businessman and her family moved to Hyderabad for her studies. She completed her B. Tech in Raja Mahendra College of Engineering, Ibrahimpatnam and worked in Infosys before pursuing a career in the film industry.

Career 
While working, Nagalla appeared in the short film Shaadi and was nominated as Best Actress at the SIIMA Short Film Awards. She was later auditioned and selected for the 2019 biographical Mallesham co-starring Priyadarshi. She was credited with her birth name Anusha Nagalla in the film. Nagalla took a break from her work to prepare for the role.  Reviewing the film, The Indian Express critic Murali Krishna CH appreciated her, stating "Ananya Nagalla shines in the role of Mallesham’s wife Padma. Her innate innocence seeps into her performance." A reviewer from The News Minute stated: "Ananya is endearing and has been given a lot of scope to emote." The Hindu Sangeetha Devi Dundoo also echoed the same and wrote: "Ananya brings in the innocence required for her part and makes a promising debut." 

In 2021, Nagalla appeared in the sci fi drama film Play Back. A reviewer of Zee Cinemalu felt that Nagalla was the stand out among the actors. "Ananya was decent but none of the other actors could do justice for their characters," they added. In the same year, she also appeared in the Pawan Kalyan-starrer Vakeel Saab, a remake of the Hindi film Pink. Director Venu Sriram cast her in the film following her role in Mallesham. Sangeetha Devi in her review for The Hindu praised her performance, stating: "The women — Nivetha, Anjali and Ananya — are remarkable. Nivetha and Ananya in particular internalise and convey the mixed feelings of courage, fear and despair effectively." A Deccan Chronicle critic wrote: "Nivetha Thomas, Anjali and Ananya have excelled in their parts, justifying each of their presence in the film."

Filmography

Feature films

Short films

References

External links 
 
 

Living people
Year of birth missing (living people)
People from Khammam district
Actresses from Telangana
Telugu actresses
Actresses in Telugu cinema
21st-century Indian actresses
Indian film actresses